Dillwynella vitrea is a species of sea snail, a marine gastropod mollusk in the family Skeneidae.

Description
The height of the shell attains 3 mm.

Distribution
This marine species occurs off Japan.

References

 Higo, S., Callomon, P. & Goto, Y. (1999). Catalogue and bibliography of the marine shell-bearing Mollusca of Japan. Osaka. : Elle Scientific Publications. 749 pp.
 Williams S.T., Karube S. & Ozawa T. (2008) Molecular systematics of Vetigastropoda: Trochidae, Turbinidae and Trochoidea redefined. Zoologica Scripta 37: 483–506.
 Kunze T. (2011) Dillwynella voightae new species, a new skeneimorph gastropod (Turbinidae) from the western Atlantic and a new record of Dillwynella modesta (Dall, 1889). The Nautilus 125(1): 36–40

External links
 

vitrea
Gastropods described in 1997